Michael Kavanagh (born 1979) is an Irish hurler.

Michael Kavanagh may also refer to:
Mike Kavanagh (born 1958), Church of England priest
Micky Kavanagh (1927–2016), Irish association footballer

See also
Michael Cavanaugh (disambiguation)
Michael Cavanagh (disambiguation)